Associação Desportiva Perilima is a soccer club from Campina Grande, Paraíba, Brazil. The club was founded on September 8, 1992. The club owner is Pedro Ribeiro Lima nicknamed 'Seu Pedro'; he is also its president. Lima, born in 1948, is also the oldest professional soccer player in the world, and the oldest player to score a goal in professional soccer worldwide in 2007 against Campinense from the penalty spot.

History

On September 1992, Pedro Ribeiro Lima founded a club named after his initials PEdro RIbeiro LIMA (Perilima). The club was founded as a factory team in a sorda candy factory owned by him.

Six years after, in 1998, the club entered its first professional championship. At the time, the team was formed by the factory workers. 'Seu Pedro' was both coach and player, they finished as runners-up and were promoted to Paraíba State Championship First Division, in which they currently play.

During a stage of financial hardship, the club was helped by members of the Orkut social network, who crowdfunded a campaign to alleviate its finances. This campaign effectively acted as a sponsorship deal, and the community's identification number was added to the uniform's shirt sleeves.

Achievements

 Campeonato Paraibano Second Division: runner-up in 5 times (1998, 2000, 2001, 2004, 2006 and 2018).

References

Association football clubs established in 1992
Football clubs in Paraíba
1992 establishments in Brazil